The Roman heritage sites in Kosovo represent a multitude of monuments of material and spiritual culture, which reflect the Roman period in this region. Among them, a special place is occupied by those that represent the development of art, such as the plastic monuments that are more frequent, and at the same time occupy an important place, because with the presentation of figures in relief and with numerous inscriptions they speak to us enough for this period.

Overview 
Dardania fell under Roman occupation in the first century AD, one of the last territories of Illyria to succumb. Being that Dardania had and today Kosovo has a central position between the road networks that connected the south Aegean with the Danube basin, and with the Adriatic Sea, it was a strategic jewel. It also was important for the Romans due to its rich mineral resources, which they exploited and benefited from. We see that most of the towns of ancient Dardania are located either close to a mine, or close to a road. The Dardanian identity has been disputed for a while, and it is known that it was distinctive, similar to the Illyrian, and also with a Roman or Thracian twist to it, due to the occupation and co-habitation. The archaeological surveys and studies of the last century are helping to establish this Dardanian identity in an objective manner, which will lead to a clearer study and explanation of the continuity of culture in this so much disputed region. Below is a listing of the prominent settlements during the Roman period and an explanation of what they were, when they were inhabited, and when they were founded, accompanied by an array of pictures that illustrate the archaeological finds and remnants.

Municipium Dardanorum 

Municipium Dardanorum or Dardanicum is located in North Kosovo, approximately 27 kilometres north of Mitrovica, in the village of Sočanica, Leposavic municipality. It existed as a prehistoric settlement at first, but continued to develop and change to become a typical ancient Roman town during the period from the last decades of the 1st century, until the first part of the 4th century AD. The site stretches in approximately 30 hectares.

Ulpiana 

Ulpiana was a Roman town, established in the 1st century AD, receiving municipium status in 169 AD. It was located near a rich mining area and also had a geo-strategic position situated close to the ancient crossroads that linked east with west, were dominant factors for the foundation, development and existence through centuries. During the Roman era, Ulpiana was one of the most active and frequented centers connecting Constantinople with Rome, and close to the town the crossroad connecting the Adriatic with the Aegean coasts, even indirectly with the Black Sea. Furthermore, the existence of the ancient communication route Via Lissus-Naissus is known; land communication networks passed close to Ulpiana. The earliest forms of occupation (human activity and civilization) date to the prehistoric period, but especially highlighted by archaeologists are the Bronze and Iron Ages. Nevertheless, the first forms of an urban centre recorded in Ulpiana date to the beginning of Roman rule, which occurred in the first century AD. With Romans settled, Ulpiana developed from a small, ancient Dardanian concentrated oppidum to a widespread territory with all attributes of a typical Roman town organization. In regard to this matter, it is believed that Ulpiana was established as a Roman municipium in 169 AD, called Municipium Ulpianum. Nonetheless, Ulpiana achieved its peak of development during the 3rd and 4th century; a period when it became a very important political, economical, cultural center of a wider area of the territory of Dardania, but also became the crucial center for the expansion of the ancient civilization in this region. The Roman town of Ulpiana during this period was ascribed as the Municipum Ulpiana Splendidissima – the Splendid City of Ulpiana, characterized with road networks, an orthogonal construction system, a water supply, drainage, houses, buildings and various other public, sacral, profane and utilitarian buildings. In addition, the Municipium of Ulpiana was a very important trading centre of either metallurgical artisans or agricultural goods and merchandise for at least the first five centuries of the first millennium, and especially during the rule of Byzantine emperor Justinian the Great in the 6th century AD - a time when Ulpiana was rebuilt and renamed to Justiniana Secunda. Since the second part of the 20th century, the ancient town of Ulpiana has been in a continuity study through the loupe and pickaxe of either local or foreign archaeologists that have contributed until present day with the discovery of a few cult and sacral monuments: a basilica and necropolis, as well as parts of ramparts with watchtowers, castrum - Roman military garrison and hundreds of movable artifacts, different in form, material and usage, as well as human remains, architectural structures and elements, all testimony of the cultural material very important for the scientific field of archaeology. The gathered data was partially studied and is under the process of systematic evaluation from various specialists of different scientific disciplines that all together contribute for the further update of the archaeological data. The site went through elaborate research studies with highly sophisticated investigative devices, which are completely non-intrusive methods of survey examination. Appreciating the cooperation, the German Archaeological Institute and the Archaeological Institute of Kosovo have jointly participated in geophysical prospecting with advanced survey/recording methods. For example: a fluxgate magnetometer, gradiometer and georadar connected with GIS, surveying around 50 hectares of land with archaeological potential within the Ulpiana area. Besides the scientific character, the underneath earth recording will aid with future pacifications and development plans for the archaeological site. In addition, the site will also benefit from a management plan for a compilation of the development plans for the promotion of the cultural heritage known as archaeotourism, which as a precondition requires a setting of tourist infrastructure at the archaeological sites. On the other hand, these advanced methods and techniques will also help on the determination of the extent of character and nature of Ulpiana, while keeping in mind that it is a multilayer site.

Vendenis 

Statio Vindenis was among three road stations that were constructed in Dardania during Roman rule. This archaeological site is located in the village of Glavnik, Podujevo municipality, approximately 5 km southeast from the town of Podujevo. The ancient Via Lissus-Naissus Roman road was a diagonal route, connecting the central Balkans region with the Adriatic coast, passing through Vindenis. The settlement and Roman road station of Vindenis are stretched on the right bank of Llap River vicinity, measuring an area of more or less of 15-20 hectares.

Pestova archaeological site 

The site of Pestova is located in the municipality of Vučitrn, discovered in 2005. Remains of a building, ruins of a villae rusticae were partially unearthed.

Poslishte archaeological site 

The site of Poslishte is a recently discovered Roman road junction in the vicinity of the village of Poslishtë, 1 kilometer south of Vlashnjë in the Vërmica-Prizren road, set along the ancient Via Lissus-Naissus.

Kllokot archaeological site 

The site of Klokot is located close to Banja e Kllokotit, in an alluvial terrace stretched along the Morava river flow, an area known for the fertile land and near the warm thermal mineral waters spring. One of the most interesting accidental archaeological discoveries is a marble sculpture of a woman found near said Banja e Kllokotit, regarded a masterpiece of Dardanian art according to Milot Berisha.

Paldenica archaeological site 

The site of Paldenica located near the village of Paldenica, around 150 m on the left side of the Pristina-Skopje road. Traces of a necropolis and other movable archaeological materials have been uncovered.

Vicianum 

Station Viciano situated in the northwest part of the municipality of Gračanica. There are relevant indications that might pinpoint the site setting of the ancient road station Viciano, a stopping point for the caravans that circulated in one of the most important trans-Illyrian roads, the Via Lissus-Naissus route, that started from the Adriatic coast, respectively from Lezhë, all the way through the Drini i Bardhë river valley, crossing diagonally through ancient Dardania and continuing further, to Niš. The Station Viciano is recorded in the Tabula Peuntingeriana map.

Nerodime e Poshtme 

Nerodimë e Poshtme site, uncovered in 1988. Several archaeological trenches were investigated at this location, close to the Orthodox cemetery. The trial trenches resulted with a discovery of a villa complex that most likely is constructed during late antiquity.

Çifllak archaeological site 

Çifllak site is situated near the Drini i Bardhë river stream, on the left side, not far from the river shore. Archaeological researches carried out at the Çifllak area during the first decade of the first millennium resulted in the discovery of the remains of a Roman bath complex, with wide dimensions. A pool has been also been unearthed and documented.

Nikadin archaeological site 

Nikadin. The Nikadin village, nowadays a suburban part of the town of Ferizaj, is situated 2 kilometers south from the town, sited in a spacious and fertile countryside. During the 1960s, superficial traces of a Roman villa complex were recorded here. During an excavation in 2007, remains of an early Christian church were also unearthed.

See also
 Illyrians
 Dardanians
 Kingdom of Dardania
 Roman cities in Illyria
 Illyricum (Roman province)
 Dardania (Roman province)

References

Bibliography

Nicholas Marquez Grant, Linda Fibiger. "Kosovo" The Routledge Handbook of Archaeological Human Remains and Legislation, Taylor & Francis, 2011, 
Milot Berisha. "Archaeological Guide of Kosovo", Kosovo Ministry of Culture, Youth and Sports and Archaeological Institute of Kosovo, Prishtine 2012, Print
Luan Përzhita, Kemajl Luci, Gëzim Hoxha, Adem Bunguri, Fatmir Peja, Tomor Kastrati. "Harta Arkeologjike e Kosovës vëllimi 1/ Archaeological Map of Kosovo vol.1" Akademia e Shkencave dhe e Arteve e Kosovës, Prishtinë 2006, 
Cultural Heritage Without Borders. "An Archaeological Map of the Historic Zone of Prizren", CHwB Kosovo office, Report Series No.2/2006.
Gail Warrander, Verena Knaus. "Kosovo 2nd ed." Bradt Travel Guides, 2011, 
Besiana Xharra, Source: Balkan Insight, "Kosovo's Lost City Rises From Earthy Tomb", http://archaeologynewsnetwork.blogspot.com/2011/01/kosovos-lost-city-rises-from-earthy.html#.UR95dvI7owo
Tom Derrick, "Ulpiana: Digging in Kosovo" source: http://www.trinitysaintdavid.ac.uk/en/schoolofclassics/news/name,14937,en.html
Philip L. Kohl, Clare Fawcett, "Nationalism, Politics and the Practice of Archaeology", Cambridge University Press, 1995, 

Illyrian Kosovo
Archaeology of Illyria
Archaeology of Kosovo
Roman towns and cities in Kosovo
Archaeological sites in Kosovo